Gostkowice may refer to the following places in Poland:
Gostkowice, Lower Silesian Voivodeship (south-west Poland)
Gostkowice, Lubusz Voivodeship (west Poland)